Charadra tapa is a moth of the family Noctuidae. It is found in the Chiricahua, Huachuca, and Santa Rita Mountains of south-eastern Arizona, although the species probably occurs in adjacent parts of Mexico.

The length of the forewings is 18 mm for males and 19 mm for females. The main flight period is from September to October; a single specimen from early May indicates there may be spring flight.

Larvae have been reared on Quercus gambelii.

Etymology
The name tapa is an anagram of pata.

External links
The North American species of Charadra Walker, with a revision of the Charadra pata (Druce) group (Noctuidae, Pantheinae)

Pantheinae
Chiricahua Mountains
Moths described in 2010